Ciudad Bendita is a Venezuelan telenovela produced and broadcast by Venevisión and distributed internationally by Venevisión International. The telenovela is an original story written by Leonardo Padrón.

Marisa Román and Roque Valero star as the main protagonists. Since January 9, 2012, the telenovela has aired in Venezuela through cable channel Venevision Plus to repeated 4pm at 11:30 pm.  It is considered a most successful telenovela written by Leonardo Padrón, after Cosita rica.

Plot 
Set in the heat of a popular market, Ciudad Bendita tells the love story between two peddlers, two losers, two people of the heap, as anonymous as any. Bendita Sanchez has a detail that obscures her beauty: a limp. On a bus trip back to Caracas she meets Juan Lobo, an ugly man that dreams of becoming a musician, and he instantly falls in love with her.
 
However, Bendita happens to love another: Yunior Mercado, a metrosexual playboy, and only views Juan Lobo as a friend despite his composing of various songs to win her favor.

Ciudad Bendita is a great tribute to unrequited love, as well as the story of a country, a people, an entire community living on poverty, and a handful of survivors who dream of learning the key to happiness in the muddy streets of a Latin American city.

Cast

Starring 
 Marisa Román as Bendita Sánchez 
 Roque Valero as Juan Lobo

Also starring 

 Juan Carlos García as Yúnior Mercado
 Alba Roversi as María "Maga" Gabriela
 Nohely Arteaga as Magaly de Mercado / Doble M
 Gledys Ibarra as Mercedes Zuleta / La Diabla
 Yanis Chimaras as Guaicaipuro Mercado / Puro
 Beatriz Valdés as Trina de Palacios
 Caridad Canelón as Peregrina de Lobo
 Henry Soto as Kike "Kikin" Palacios
 Carlos Cruz as Baldomero Sánchez
 Carlota Sosa as Julia Barrios de Venturini
 Lourdes Valera as Francisca
 Luis Gerónimo Abreu as Jorge Venturini / Grillo
 Milena Santander as Prudencia Barrios
 Guillermo Dávila as Macario
 Manuel Salazar as Rotundo Quiñones
 Daniela Bascopé as Fedora Palacios
 Elaiza Gil as Mi Alma
 Ana María Simón as Mediática
 Andreína Yépez as Zulay Montiel Barranco
 Alejandro Corona as Etcétera
 Jessica Grau as Marugenia "Maru" Torrealba
 Yván Romero as Kenny G
 María Cristina Lozada as Consuelo
 Carlos Villamizar as Robinson Sánchez
 Freddy Galavís as Ismael Lobo
 Mirtha Borges as Bertha
 Pedro Durán as Cafecito
 Humberto García as Fausto
 Martín Lantigua as Tobías
 Jean Paul Leroux as Jerry Colón
 Anastasia Mazzone as Kimberly Mercado
 Laureano Olivares as Julio Augusto Sánchez 
 Susej Vera as Valentina
 Josemith Bermúdez as Tiki
 Antonio Delli as Gonzalo Venturini
 Erika Pacheco as Vera
 Adriana Romero as Yamilé
 Paula Woyzechowsky as Rosita

 David Garcés as Ricardo
 Simón Rojas as Cheo

Special participation 
 Carlos Montilla as Darwin Manuel

References

2006 telenovelas
Venevisión telenovelas
2006 Venezuelan television series debuts
2007 Venezuelan television series endings
Venezuelan telenovelas
Spanish-language telenovelas
Television shows set in Caracas